The Green Progressive Accord (Dutch: Groen Progressief Akkoord) was an alliance of Dutch political parties: Political Party of Radicals (PPR), Pacifist Socialist Party (PSP), Communist Party of the Netherlands (CPN) and Green Party of the Netherlands (GPN).

The parties entered in the 1984 European Parliament elections with a common list. The alliance won 2 seats, one was taken by Bram van der Lek (PSP) and another by Herman Verbeek (PPR).

Five years later the Political Party of Radicals (PPR), Communist Party of the Netherlands (CPN) and Pacifist Socialist Party (PSP) entered in the 1989 European Parliament elections with a common list called "The Rainbow".

In 1990 these three parties merged to form GreenLeft (GroenLinks) together with the Evangelical People's Party (EVP).

C.P.N. Green Party Netherlands P.P.R. P.S.P.

See also
List of GreenLeft Members of the European Parliament for a list of the MEPs of this alliance.

References

GroenLinks
Political party alliances in the Netherlands